Tober is a townland in County Westmeath, Ireland.

Tober is one of 14 townlands of the civil parish of Multyfarnham in the barony of Corkaree in the Province of Leinster. 

The neighbouring townlands are Ballynakill to the north–east, Ballinphort to the east and south, Lismalady to the south, Froghanstown to the south–west and Donore to the north–west.

In the 1911 census of Ireland there were 2 houses and 7 inhabitants in the townland.

References

External links
Map of Tober at openstreetmap.org
Tober at the IreAtlas Townland Data Base
Tober at Townlands.ie
Tober at The Placenames Database of Ireland

Townlands of County Westmeath